Andreadoxa is a genus of flowering plants belonging to the family Rutaceae.

Its native range is Northeastern Brazil.

Species:

Andreadoxa flava

References

Zanthoxyloideae
Zanthoxyloideae genera